For the British publisher, see Andrew Melrose.

Andrew W. Melrose (1836-1901) was a Scottish-born American painter.

References

1836 births
1901 deaths
Scottish emigrants to the United States
American painters